Euphorbia flanaganii, commonly known as Transkei medusa's head, is a succulent plant that belongs to the family Euphorbiaceae. Due to the breadth of the Euphorbiaceae, little research specific to E. flanaganii has been conducted.

Taxonomy
It is believed to be closely related to E. hypogaea and E. procumbens, resulting from a common speciation event. However, the phylogenetic association between the three species remains relatively unreliable, with values of only 53/.66 attributed to the linkage. Euphorbia flanaganii is in subgenus Athymalus, which comprises 150 species.

Description

It is an agglomerated, thorny, succulent plant with snake-like branches that has a swollen underground stem. It is a dwarf shrub with a size of 0.02 to 0.05 m in height that is found at an altitude of 30 to 185 meters. Leaves are rather small, only 10 mm long and 1 mm broad. Its branches grow horizontally, up to 400 mm in diameter. It has inflorescence in cyathium with a single, 4 mm long flower per flower stalk that bloom in late summer and autumn.

It has photosynthetic modified stems that lack, or have delayed development of, periderm. Careful observation of E. flanaganii specimens also reveals modified, needle-like leaves, radial geometric symmetry, and a seemingly tuberous above ground root structure.

Distribution
Species within Athymalus, including E. flanaganii, are found only in arid regions such as the Arabian Peninsula, the Canary Islands, Madagascar, and South Africa.

Evolution
The historical and modern day geographical home of the subgenus, and the diversity level among species in the same region, suggest species in Athymalus are a lineage of early divergence. A large speciation event of Euphorbia is believed to have occurred over the course of 3 million to 10 million years ago, due to a significant change in climate, in what are now considered to be modern arid regions; the Athymalus subgenus is believed to have evolved during this period. 

Given the present body of knowledge that pertains to other Euphorbia species found in the same regions as E. flanaganii, and historical evolutionary events, it is highly likely that E. flanaganii is roughly 3–10 million years old as well.

References

flanaganii
Flora of Madagascar
Flora of the Canary Islands
Flora of the Arabian Peninsula
Flora of South Africa
Garden plants of Southern Africa
Taxa named by N. E. Brown